Howrytown was the name of a settlement near Daleville in Botetourt County, Virginia, United States.

History
Howrytown was laid out by Jacob Howry on the Great Wagon Road. He sold 40 lots to 23 people, beginning June 1, 1795. 

The settlement is mentioned as a "hamlet" in 1835.

Geography
The site of Howrytown lies at the intersection of VA-670 (Trinity Road) and VA-673 (Greenfield Street), approximately 7 miles south of Fincastle.

References

 
 

1795 establishments in Virginia
Geography of Botetourt County, Virginia
Ghost towns in Virginia